The Musée de la Contrefaçon is a museum of counterfeiting. It is located at 16, rue de la Faisanderie, in the 16th arrondissement of Paris, France, and open daily except Monday; an admission fee is charged. The nearest métro and RER stations are Porte Dauphine and Avenue Foch.

The museum was established in 1951 by Union des Fabricants (Unifab), an organization of manufacturers. It currently exhibits more than 350 items, pairing each counterfeit with its authentic original. A wide variety of items are displayed, including toys, pens, clothes, tools, toiletries, luxury goods, etc.

See also 
 List of museums in Paris

References 
 Musée de la Contrefaçon

Museums in Paris
Buildings and structures in the 16th arrondissement of Paris
Law enforcement museums in France